The Free Software and Open Source Symposium (FSOSS) is a yearly event at Seneca College, Canada, focused on free and open-source software. The event has been held since 2001. It is run by Seneca College faculty. Attendees include both students and IT industry professionals.

Speakers for the 2008 conference included members of Mozilla, Fedora, Google, IBM, SourceForge, OpenOffice.org, Novell, Eclipse Foundation and Creative Commons. The Teaching Open Source @ FSOSS program was added in 2008.

References

External links
 FSOSS – FSOSS home

Free-software conferences
Linux conferences